Wockia is a genus of moths in the family Urodidae containing around 10 described species. Individuals are small and relatively dull gray in color.

Larvae (caterpillars) are known to feed on plants in the family Salicaceae, with W. asperipunctella feeding on species of  willows (Salix) and Populus , while W. chewbacca feeds on the leaves of the Casearia', albeit it avoids the veins to prevent any indigestion.
The species in the Wockia genus do not have a long development time, which allows for multiple generations to occur. Specifically, the W. chewbacca takes typically two weeks to develop from egg to pupa and then another ten days in a cocoon to become an adult.   

SpeciesWockia asperipunctella (Bruand 1851) - Holarctic Wockia balikpapanella Kyrki, 1986 - BorneoWockia chewbacca Adamski, 2009 - MexicoWockia diabolica Sohn, 2013 - JamaicaWockia koreana Sohn, 2008 - KoreaWockia magna Sohn, 2014 - Japan and KoreaWockia mexicana Adamski, 2009 - MexicoWockia tetroidon Sohn, 2013 - JamaicaWockia variata'' Sohn and Park, 2013 - Vietnam

References

Urodidae
Moth genera